Phillip B. Williams (born 1986) is an American poet. Born in Chicago, he is the author of the chapbooks Bruised Gospels and Burn as well as the full length poetry collections Thief in the Interior and MUTINY.

Career 
He graduated with an MFA from Washington University where he was a Chancellor’s Graduate fellow. For several years he was a faculty member at Bennington College. Williams was a Poetry Fellow at the 2018 Conference on Poetry at The Frost Place. His poetry has been featured in Callaloo, The Kenyon Review Online, The Southern Review, Painted Bride Quarterly, West Branch, and Blackbird. Williams is a Cave Canem Foundation graduate as well as co-editor in chief, with KMA Sullivan, of the online journal Vinyl.

His work has been praised for its "devout and excruciating attention to the line [whose] indispensable  music fuses his implacable understanding of words with their own shadows."

Awards
Thief in the Interior was the winner of the 2017 Kate Tufts Discovery Award and the Lambda Literary Award for Gay Poetry at the 29th Lambda Literary Awards. In 2017 Williams was awarded a Whiting Award for Poetry.

Works 
Bruised Gospels (Arts in Bloom Inc., 2011), 
Burn (YesYes Books, 2013), 
Thief in the Interior (Alice James Books, 2016). , 
MUTINY: Poems (Penguin, 2021).
Anthologies
Jericho Brown (ed) Prime : poetry & conversation, Alexander, AR: Sibling Rivalry Press, 2014. ,

References

1986 births
Living people
Writers from Chicago
Lambda Literary Award for Gay Poetry winners
21st-century American poets
American male poets
African-American poets
American LGBT poets
LGBT African Americans
American gay writers
Washington University in St. Louis alumni
21st-century American male writers
Gay poets